The 2003–04 DFB-Pokal was the 61st season of the annual German football cup competition. 64 teams competed in the tournament of six rounds which began on 29 August 2003 and ended on 29 May 2004. In the final Werder Bremen defeated second-tier Alemannia Aachen, who knocked out defending champions Bayern Munich in the quarter-finals, 3–2, thereby becoming the fifth team in German football to win the double. It was Bremen's fifth win in the cup.

Matches

First round

* The match ended 1–2 (after extra time), but was awarded 2–0 to Sportfreunde Siegen due to LR Ahlen fielding four non-EU nationals, more than the maximum of three.

Second round

Round of 16

Quarter-finals

Semi-finals

Final

References

External links
 Official site of the DFB 
 Kicker.de 

2003-04
2003–04 in German football cups